Rincón or Rincón Pozo is a barrio in the municipality of Sabana Grande, Puerto Rico. Its population in 2010 was 3,450.

History
Puerto Rico was ceded by Spain in the aftermath of the Spanish–American War under the terms of the Treaty of Paris of 1898 and became an unincorporated territory of the United States. In 1899, the United States Department of War conducted a census of Puerto Rico finding that the population of Rincón barrio was 1,244.

In 1953, three school children claimed to have seen an apparition of the Virgen Mary in Rincón, Sabana Grande. The incident was investigated by the Catholic Church, however, the church did not find evidence to corroborate the event. Still 37 years later, thousands of Catholics went to the location to venerate Our Lady of the Rosary.

See also

 List of communities in Puerto Rico

References

Barrios of Sabana Grande, Puerto Rico